A prison break is an unlawful act under Nigerian law, of a prisoner forcing their way out of a prison. It can also be described as attacks on the Nigerian Prisons Services by terrorists such as Boko Haram and armed robbers in which many prisoners are released. Often, when this occurs effort are made by the Nigerian Prisons Services in conjunction with security agency to rearrest the escapee and return them to the prison and this may result in the extension of their jail term.  Prison break in Nigeria may be attributed to corruption, poor funding of the prison services, poor prison facilities, inadequate security features such as CCTV, motion sensors, high wall made up of barbed wire and sometimes electric fencing of the wall.

Methods
Several methods can be used to facilitate prison break. Physical method is the most common method adopted by the perpetrators of Nigeria prison break. This method involved the use of arms and sometimes explosives such as dynamite to subdue the prison armed guard and other officials resulting in fatal casualties.

Punishments
In Nigeria, prison break is a criminal offense that is punishable under the Law of Nigeria. The punishment varies depending on the nature of the attack, casualties involved in the attack and the nature of the offenses for which the participant were imprisoned.

Reported cases

Prison breaks are a pervasive issue in Nigeria due to a lack of security and being a common target by militants. Prison breaks have resulted in the escape of over 7,000 prisoners from Nigerian prisons since 2010.

Bauchi prison break

On 7 September 2010, a prison break was reported in Bauchi prison in the northern Nigerian city of Bauchi by 50 gunmen suspected to be members of Boko Haram. This attack resulted in the escape of 721 prisoners, leaving 5 people dead with 6 injured persons.

Edo prison break (2012) 

On 19 August 2012, a prison break was reported in Oko by unknown gunmen, it was reported that explosives were used in the attack however the police denied that claim, no deaths were recorded, no fewer than 10 inmates escaped.

Ogun prison break

On 4 January 2013, it was reported that Shagamu minimum prison in the southwestern Nigerian city of Ogun State were attacked resulting in the escape of 20 prisoners leaving several prison officials and other prisoners injured. About 4 escapee were rearrested by the Armed Squad of the Prison Service.

Ondo prison break

On 30 June 2013, it was reported that the Olokuta Medium Security Prison in Akure, the capital of Ondo State, Nigeria were attacked by 50 unknown gunmen suspected to be Armed robbers. The prison break resulted in the escape of 175 prisoners leaving 2 people dead and 1 warder injured. About 54 escapee were rearrested.

Lagos prison break

On 10 October 2014, an unsuccessful prison break at the Kirikiri Medium Prison  in Lagos State, a southwestern Nigeria by some convicted inmates of the prison was reported. This incident left 20 prisoner dead and 80 others injured and 12 escape.

Kogi prison break

On 2 November 2014, another prison break was reported in Koto-Karffi Federal Medium Security Prisons in Kogi State, a north-central Nigeria by numbers of gunmen suspected to be members of  Boko Haram. This incident resulted in the escape of 144 prisoners from the prison leaving 1 inmate dead and 45 escaped prisoners were rearrested.

Ekiti prison break

On 30 November 2014, another attack on the federal prison at Ado Ekiti, a city of Ekiti State by 60 unknown gunmen was reported. This attack resulted in the escape of 341 prisoners leaving one prison official dead. About 10 prisoners were recaptured during the attack and 67 escapee was rearrested thereafter.

Minna prison break

On 6 December 2014, about a week after the Ekiti prison break, Minna medium prison was attacked by 3 unknown gunmen suspected to be armed robbers. This prison break resulted in the escape of 270 prisoners leaving 1 security officer injured with no death recorded.

Kuje prison break

On 24 June 2016, there was a jailbreak at the Kuje Medium Security in the Federal Capital Territory where two high profile inmates in persons of Solomon Amodu and Maxwell Ajukwu both of them awaiting trial for homicide escaped from custody by scaling through the fence. The Kuje prison chief was removed after this jailbreak by the Controller General of the Nigerian Prison service.

On 29 August 2016, authorities of the Nigeria Prisons in the Federal Capital Territory reported another unsuccessful attempted jailbreak at the Kuje Medium Security Prison. Authorities said some inmates tried to resist the routine cell-search which is part of the operational guidelines which led to an altercation between the officers and the inmates. The situation was quickly put under control and order restored as no prisoner was injured or any property damaged in the facility.

Owerri prison break

On 5 April 2021, a group believed to be Eastern Security Network attacked Owerri Prison in Owerri, Imo State. ESN came into the prison heavily armed with machine guns, rocket-propelled grenades and improvised explosive devices. The militants used explosives to access the administrative block and released 1,844 inmates and also burnt down other police facilities within the vicinity of the prison.

Edo prison break (2020)

On 19 October 2020, a group of people under the disguise of ENDSARs protesters, allegedly attacked the prisons in Benin City and Oko in Edo State freeing about 1,993 inmates in custody and looted the facility carting away weapons. The attackers came in large numbers with dangerous weapons and attacked the officers on guard duty and quickly forced the cells open and destroyed properties in the facility.

References

Crime in Nigeria
Prison escapes